Hirokawa (written: 廣川 or 広川) is a Japanese surname. Notable people with the surname include:

, Japanese engineer
, Japanese neuroscientist and cell biologist
, Japanese voice actor

Japanese-language surnames